RPV may mean:

 Rancho Palos Verdes
 Reactor pressure vessel
 Remote-Person View
 Remotely Piloted Vehicle
 Republican Party of Virginia
 Rilpivirine, a drug against HIV/AIDS